The 1988 European Open was a women's tennis tournament played on outdoor clay courts at the Drizia-Miremont Tennis Club in Geneva in Switzerland and was part of the Category 2 of the 1988 WTA Tour. The tournament ran from 16 May until 22 May 1988. Barbara Paulus won the singles title.

Finals

Singles

 Barbara Paulus defeated  Lori McNeil 6–4, 5–7, 6–1
 It was Paulus' 1st title of the year and the 1st of her career.

Doubles

 Christiane Jolissaint /  Dianne van Rensburg defeated  Maria Lindström /  Claudia Porwik 6–1, 6–3
 It was Jolissaint's 2nd title of the year and the 5th of her career. It was van Rensburg's only title of the year and the 2nd of her career.

References

External links
 ITF tournament edition details

European Open
WTA Swiss Open
1988 in Swiss tennis
1988 in Swiss women's sport